The 2009 IAAF World Half Marathon Championships was held in Birmingham, United Kingdom on 11 October 2009. It was the final event of the International Association of Athletics Federations' 2009 World Athletics Series.

Organisation
The city of Birmingham was selected by the IAAF Council after a presentation by UK Athletics and the Birmingham City Council. It was the third time the championships were held in Great Britain, after the 1992 event on Tyneside and the 2001 edition in Bristol. A number of events were scheduled to coincide with the Championships: a three-day convention for Association of International Marathons and Distance Races, as well as an IAAF press conference to discuss the future and progression of the sport.

In addition to the main World Championship races, the Birmingham Half Marathon started thirty minutes after the women's World Championship race. Organised by Birmingham City Council and sponsored by EDF Energy, it was the second edition of the mass race which attracted over 9000 runners in 2008. A total of 12,068 people signed up to run the Birmingham Half Marathon.

A total of 47 IAAF member federations sent athletes to the championships, the highest number since the 2002 edition.

Course
The men's race and women's race started at BST 9.00 am and 9:30 am, respectively. The course passed through Birmingham city centre and the city's southern suburbs, Centenary Square acting as the start and end point of the race. Highlights along the route included Cannon Hill Park, Cadbury World and the Bournville model village, Edgbaston Cricket Ground, Victoria Square and the Bull Ring. The course is largely straight and flat, although there is an abrupt descent and ascent at the start and finish of the route, and slight rises and falls between the 10 and 16 km marks around Selly Park.

Competition

Pre-race

Eritrean runner Zersenay Tadese, who had won the last two World Half Marathons as well as the 20 km race in 2006, announced that he would attempt to defend his title and his chances improved after world leader Patrick Makau Musyoki was not listed from the Kenyan squad. The defending women's champion Lornah Kiplagat did not attempt to defend her title due to a knee injury, and three-time champion Paula Radcliffe filled the void, aiming for a record fourth title. However, she too withdrew from the event due to tonsillitis, dealing a blow to the host nation's chances.

Tadese was the outright favourite of the men's race, with his greatest challenge coming from Kenyans Sammy Kitwara, Wilson Kipsang Kiprotich and Bernard Kiprop Kipyego, Ethiopians Tilahun Regassa and Dereje Tesfaye. Dathan Ritzenhein, Fabiano Joseph Naasi and Marilson dos Santos were other outside chances. The Kenyan and Eritrean men's teams were favoured for the gold and silver team medals, while the team's from Ethiopia, Tanzania and Uganda were suggested as possible bronze medallists. Unusually, Qatar (whose team placed third in 2008) did not send any runners to the competition.

In the women's race, Kenyan Mary Jepkosgei Keitany was the favourite in the absence of Kiplagat and Radcliffe. Keitany went into the championships as the world's leading half marathon runner, having run 1:07:00 seconds earlier in the season, and the race was seen as a chance for her to make her mark over the distance. The next fastest runner that season was her compatriot Philes Ongori, although her time of 1:07:50 was some way off Keitany's. Two more possible medallists, Filomena Cheyech and Caroline Cheptanui Kilel rounded out a strong Kenyan squad. The Ethiopian team was missing two of their best runners (Dire Tune and Aselefech Mergia), but Abebu Gelan and Aberu Kebede were still in medal contention. The Japanese athletes, Yukiko Akaba and Yurika Nakamura, looked to maintain Japan's past podium form in the team competition. New Zealand's Kim Smith was regarded as an unknown quantity, as she was moving to the road competitions after much success on the track.

At the pre-race press conference the IAAF General Secretary, Pierre Weiss, lamented the relative lack of interest in the competition, vocalising the IAAF's dissatisfaction with the number of competing athletes and federations. He acknowledged that the competition's prize money was not at parity with other top level marathons. Wilson Kipketer, the 800 metres world record holder, pointed out that the standard of Europe's long-distance runners had been largely surpassed by other region's athletes, most notably by Africa. Kipketer argued that Europeans were not making the most of their sporting facilities and were "not training properly or timing and planning their seasons properly". Ed Warner, chairman of UK Athletics, agreed that a rethink was needed in terms of training and mindset.

Medallists
Detailed reports on the event and an appraisal of the results were given both
for the men's race and for the women's race.

Race results
Complete results were published for the men's race, for the women's race, for men's team, and for women's team.

Men's

Women's

(1:09:53), but her competition results were annulled, beginning October 10,
2009, because of breaking anti-doping regulations.

Team results

Men's

Women's

†: The team from Russia was initially ranked 3rd (3:31:23), but fell behind Japan after the disqualification of Inga Abitova.

Participation
The participation of 157 athletes (98 men/59 women) from 39 countries is reported.

 (2)
 (5)
 (5)
 (1)
 (2)
 (1)
 (2)
 (1)
 (6)
 (1)
 (10)
 (6)
 (1)
 (3)
 (7)
 (10)
 (10)
 (1)
 (2)
 (6)
 (4)
 (1)
 (8)
 (1)
 (3)
 (5)
 (5)
 (1)
 (3)
 (1)
 (8)
 (3)
 (3)
 (1)
 (1)
 (5)
 (10)
 (10)
 (2)

References
General
2009 IAAF World Half Marathon Championships results. IAAF (2009-10-11). Retrieved on 2009-10-11.
Specific

External links
Official event website
IAAF website

World Half Marathon Championships
World Half Marathon Championships
World Athletics Half Marathon Championships
World Half Marathon Championships
International athletics competitions hosted by England